Lucas Leandro Marín (born 22 January 1992) is an Argentine footballer who plays for Spanish club Inter de Madrid as a right-back.

Club career
Leandro scored his first goal against Rosario Central in the 2014 Copa Sudamericana on 4 September 2014, the match ended 1-1.

Career statistics

References

External links
 

1992 births
Living people
People from Neuquén
Argentine footballers
Argentine expatriate footballers
Association football defenders
Boca Juniors footballers
Club Atlético Tigre footballers
Arsenal de Sarandí footballers
FC Lausanne-Sport players
Club Atlético Patronato footballers
Internacional de Madrid players
Argentine Primera División players
Swiss Super League players
Primera Federación players
Argentine expatriate sportspeople in Switzerland
Argentine expatriate sportspeople in Spain
Expatriate footballers in Switzerland
Expatriate footballers in Spain